Keith Rabois (born March 17, 1969) is an American technology executive and investor. He is currently a general partner at Founders Fund. He is widely known for his early-stage startup investments and his executive roles at PayPal, LinkedIn, Slide, and Square (now known as Block, Inc.). Rabois invested in Yelp and Xoom prior to each company's initial public offering ("IPO") and sits on both companies' boards of directors. He is considered a member of the PayPal Mafia, a group that includes PayPal co-founders Peter Thiel, Reid Hoffman, Elon Musk, and PayPal employee and YouTube co-founder Jawed Karim. Additionally, Rabois has been involved in investments in YouTube, Palantir, Lyft, Airbnb, Eventbrite, Wish, and The Org.

Early life and education
Rabois was born on March 17, 1969, and raised in Edison, New Jersey. Rabois studied political science as an undergraduate at Stanford University, receiving his B.A. in 1991 and a J.D. from Harvard Law School in 1994. While at Stanford, he became acquainted with Peter Thiel, then-editor and co-founder of The Stanford Review. Rabois later contributed to the libertarian newspaper. Rabois was one of several students reprimanded for shouting homophobic slurs outside an instructor's home, including the suggestion that the instructor "die of AIDS." Rabois stated that the incident was designed to challenge Stanford's rules on student speech. Thiel later defended Rabois in his book, The Diversity Myth: Multiculturalism and Political Intolerance on Campus.

He clerked for the United States Court of Appeals for the Fifth Circuit and worked at Sullivan & Cromwell.

Business career

PayPal

Rabois served as Executive Vice President, Business Development, Public Affairs, and Policy at PayPal from November 2000 to November 2002.

LinkedIn

Between January 2005 and May 2007, Rabois worked at LinkedIn as its vice president for Business and Corporate Development. LinkedIn was founded by Reid Hoffman, also a former employee at PayPal and a member of the PayPal Mafia.

Square
After some unsuccessful ventures, in 2010, Rabois joined Square, a company that provides an electronic payment service, as its Chief Operating Officer (COO).

Sexual harassment charge 
Rabois left Square in January, 2013 due to the threat of a lawsuit over sexual harassment accusations by an employee; Rabois claims that the relationship was consensual. A spokesperson from Square said in a statement that "Keith exercised poor judgment that ultimately undermined his ability to remain an effective leader at Square."

Khosla Ventures

In March 2013, Rabois joined venture capital firm Khosla Ventures. Rabois left in 2019.

Scribd

In January 2015, Rabois joined the board of directors of Scribd after Khosla Ventures led a new investment round in the company.

Opendoor

In April 2014, Rabois co-founded Opendoor, a home buying and selling marketplace.

Alliance of American Football

In March 2018, Rabois invested in the Alliance of American Football, along with Peter Thiel and Peter Chernin. He sat on the league's board of directors.

Founders Fund 
In 2019 Rabois left Khosla Ventures and joined Founders Fund as a general partner.

In 2021, while at Founders Fund, Rabois co-founded Miami-based OpenStore, a retail-holding startup that acquire brands in the Shopify ecosystem. It raised $75 million at a $750 million valuation.

Politics

In April 2013, a lobbying group called FWD.us was launched, with Rabois listed as one of a major contributor on the group's website. In January 2020, Rabois stated that he would rather vote for Donald Trump than Bernie Sanders. In 2019 Rabois also stated that Pete Buttigieg was his top choice for the Democratic ticket.

Personal life 
In November 2015, Rabois purchased a house in Glen Park. He planned a renovation that included a new penthouse level, a basketball court, lockers and a sauna, but received pushback from six of his neighbors.

In 2018, Rabois married Jacob Helberg. The ceremony held in St. Barts was officiated by Sam Altman.

In November 2020, it was reported that he moved from California to Miami, Florida.

See also

 Square (application)
 PayPal Mafia

References

External links

Living people
American business executives
Businesspeople from the San Francisco Bay Area
Stanford University alumni
People from Edison, New Jersey
Gay men
LGBT people from New Jersey
Harvard Law School alumni
1969 births
Sullivan & Cromwell people
Alliance of American Football executives
Midas List